The Crisis of the Democratic Intellect: The Problem of Generalism and Specialisation in Twentieth-Century Scotland is a 1986 book by philosopher George Elder Davie.

Reviews
 Maxwell, Stephen, 1986), The Crisis of the Democratic Intellect, in Lawson, Alan (ed.), Radical Scotland, Oct/Nov 1986, pp. 16 & 117, 

1986 non-fiction books
Contemporary philosophical literature
Books about Scotland
Polygon Books books